The Harpe was a mythical sword in Greek and Roman mythology.

Harpe may also refer to:

People:
 Josef Harpe (1887 – 1968), German military general
 Winfield S. Harpe ( 1937 –  1988), American Air Force officer 
 The Harpe brothers (Micajah and Wiley Harpe), American mass murderers

In biology:
 Harpe, a junior synonym of the fish genus Bodianus
 Harpe, a reproductive structure in insects that is part of the valva

Other
 Harpe (mythology), a character in Greek mythology

See also 
 Harp (disambiguation)
 La Harpe (disambiguation)